Okole may refer to the following places:
Okole, Kuyavian-Pomeranian Voivodeship (north-central Poland)
Okole, Pomeranian Voivodeship (north Poland)
Okole, Stargard County in West Pomeranian Voivodeship (north-west Poland)
Okole, Szczecinek County in West Pomeranian Voivodeship (north-west Poland)